General elections were held in Kenya in September 1944.

Campaign
Nominations were required to be presented by 20 July 1944. Fewer candidates than expected ran in the elections, with only four of the eleven European seats contested. Of the seven unopposed candidates, six were members of the previous Legislative Council and one (Walter Trench) was a new member, replacing the retired Francis Scott.

In Mombasa, sitting Councillor George Nicol called for Kenya, Uganda and Tanganyika to be united.

Results

References

1944 in Kenya
1944 elections in Africa
1944
1944
September 1944 events